The Wisconsin Cream City Chorus was founded on April 1, 1987, in Milwaukee, Wisconsin. Originally formed as a chorus of gays, lesbians and their friends, the chorus now strives to celebrate the rich diversity of the community at large — not just the LGBT community — through the performance of quality choral music. People of all orientations, races and faiths are welcome to join and participate.

The chorus ended operations on April 1, 2012, with a concert given on that day, 25 years exactly since its founding.

The group had recorded a CD called Our Legacy which was available for purchase at that time.

Structure of the chorus
A board of directors, including a president, vice president, treasurer and secretary. It was a non-profit organization.

There were two types of members. 
- Non-Singing members who support the organization through non-singing efforts such as stage management, publicity, fundraising and front of house. 
- Singing members who do perform with the group.

The chorus was member-controlled. Every member, singing or non-singing had an equal vote.

Concerts
The WCCC produces two to four concerts annually.

The 2011–2012 season consisted of "A Year in the Life: Celebrating through the Seasons" with two performances on Saturday, December 10 at 7:30 pm and Sunday, December 11 at 3:00 pm. This is followed by "We Are One: Celebrating Diversity" on Sunday, April 1 at 3:00 pm. The 25th Anniversary of our founding will be a day to remember! Our annual silent auction will be held at two performances of "Schlemiel! Shlimazel! Celebrating the Cream City" on Saturday, June 16 at 5:00 pm and 7:30 pm.

The 2010–2011 season consisted of "The Poet Sings" on Saturday, December 4 at 7:30pm and Sunday, December 5 at 3:00 pm. "The Creators: Heros of the Imagination" will be held on Saturday, April 16 at 7:30 pm and Sunday, April 17 at 3:00 pm. The season ends with "Shakespeare in Song" with two performances on Saturday, June 18 at 5:00 pm and 7:30 pm.

The 2008–2009 season consisted of "One World: Dare To Dream" on Saturday, December 13 at 7:30pm. 
This is followed by "Whirled Music" to be held on April 18 at 7:30pm along with the annual silent auction. June 13 "It's A Small World, The Music of Fred Small" with two performance times of 5:00pm and 7:30pm.

In 2007 the chorus gave a concert featuring the work, "Song of Wisdom from Old Turtle." It was presented in a multi-media format, with a narrator and large screen visual display.

On Saturday, April 12, 2008, the chorus presented, "Safe Harbor : Signs of Compassion. Taking a new direction in its presentation, the show utilized a 'choral orchestra' and through song, multi media and acting portrayed historic scenes where compassion is front and center.

The final concert of the 2007-2008 season was given as part of PrideFest PrideFest (Milwaukee) in Milwaukee, held on June 6th, 7th and 8th at the Henry Maier Festival Grounds. Milwaukee's Summerfest is held there. The performance - PrideFest Musical, was the story of an intrepid group of friends from rural Wisconsin determined to enjoy the summer and find their true selves as they set out for the big city for their first PrideFest.

Group outreach
In keeping with its goal of bringing a message of diversity to the community, the chorus 
also lent vocal talents to several organizations including AIDS-related, faith-based, 
LGBT, and civic, including;

 Cross Lutheran Church
 Unitarian Universalist Church West 
 Unity West Church
 Milwaukee LGBT Community Center 
 Milwaukee PrideFest
 Camp Heartland
 The UAW M.L. King Jr. Celebration
 The Mayor’s Christmas Tree Lighting (Milwaukee)

Non-concert performances 
Past performances have included: 
 Holiday Invitational Tournament
 Memorial Services
 Weddings and Commitment Ceremonies

and many others.

Affiliated groups
The Creamettes was an ensemble of the chorus.

Notable backup performance
In 1993, 1994 & 1995 the Chorus performed as backup chorus for Barry Manilow’s Greatest Hits tour when he performed in Milwaukee. Manilow is an honorary member of Wisconsin Cream City Chorus.

Signature song
"I Love Myself Just the Way I Am", A Song of Affirmation by Jai Josefs is the Chorus's 
signature song. It was dedicated to the chorus in 1987 and is performed as the last song at 
every concert performance.

Membership
Members are required to pay dues. New members start at a probationary level and then are invited membership, followed by Tenured Member, which is full voting membership. No person will ever be turned away due to an inability to pay dues.

Corporate name
The Chorus was Incorporated with the State of Wisconsin as "The Wisconsin Cream City Chorus, 
Ltd." as a non-profit organizations.

Name explanation
Cream City is a nickname given to Milwaukee because of a brick manufacturing company that 
produced a light colored brick. While the official name is Wisconsin Cream City Chorus, it is common to refer to the group as Cream City Chorus, or Milwaukee Cream City Chorus.

Directors
Kristen L. Weber, Artistic Director

Chuck Ellingson, Associate Director

Musical groups established in 1987
LGBT choruses
American choirs
Musical groups from Wisconsin
LGBT culture in Wisconsin